Tasmannia glaucifolia, fragrant pepperbush, is a shrub endemic to New South Wales, Australia.

References

glaucifolia